Massing is a term in architecture which refers to the perception of the general shape and form as well as size of a building.

Massing in architectural theory
Massing refers to the structure in three dimensions (form), not just its outline from a single perspective (shape). Massing influences the sense of space which the building encloses, and helps to define both the interior space and the exterior shape of the building. The creation of massing, and changes to it, may be additive (accumulating or repeating masses) or subtractive (creating spaces or voids in a mass by removing parts of it). Massing can also be significantly altered by the materials used for the building's exterior, as transparent, reflective, or layered materials are perceived differently.

It is widely accepted that architectural design begins by studying massing. From a distance, massing, more than any architectural detail, is what creates the most impact on the eye. Architectural details or ornaments may serve to reinforce or minimize massing. Because it has a direct relation to the visual impact a building makes, massing is one of the most important architectural design considerations.

Massing also has an effect on building energy efficiency. A complex shape can present more opportunities for heat loss through the building envelope. Reducing the number of exterior walls, along with a low vertical surface area to floor area ratio (VFAR) decreases heat loss potential. 
 
Some architectural styles are closely associated with massing. For example, the Prairie School is always low and horizontal, while the Gothic style emphasizes verticality and Georgian architecture focuses on solidity and a sense of permanence.

References

Architectural theory
de:Kubatur